Following is a list of peaks in the Western Ghats:

References

External links
 Highest peaks in Tamil Nadu and Southern India

 list
Western Ghats